Tobias is an unincorporated community in Scott Township, Marion County, Ohio, United States.

The Tobias Post Office was established on May 3, 1894, and discontinued on September 30, 1905. Mail service is now handled through the Marion branch. In 1922, there was a grain elevator in operation here.

References

Unincorporated communities in Marion County, Ohio